Melanie Kaye/Kantrowitz (1945 – July 10, 2018) was an American essayist, poet, academic, and political activist against racism and for economic and social justice.

Early life
Born Melanie Kaye in 1945 in Brooklyn, New York, her parents had anglicized their last name from Kantrowitz prior to her birth. Her grandparents emigrated to the United States from Eastern Europe.

She later added Kantrowitz to her name to honor her Jewish roots. Kaye/Kantrowitz was active in the Harlem Civil Rights Movement as a teenager. When she was 17, she worked with the Harlem Education Project. About this she said "It was my first experience with a mobilizing proud community and with the possibilities of collective action."

Kaye/Kantrowitz associated her activism with her Jewish upbringing, stating that it was related to her family's Jewish cultural and political heritage "as much as the candles we lit for Hanukkah, or the Seders where bread and matzoh shared the table." She wrote in her essay "To Be a Radical Jew in the Late 20th Century" that her "parents had not pushed [her] into activism, yet clearly they raised [her] to do these things".

In 1966, she left New York to attend graduate school in Berkeley, California. Later, she moved to Portland, Oregon, where she remained until 1979 before spending several years in New Mexico.

Activism
Kaye/Kantrowitz described herself as a "Conscious Jew". Along with Irena Klepfisz and Adrienne Rich, among others, Kaye/Kantrowitz was a member of Di Vilde Chayes  (English: The Wild Beasts), a Jewish feminist group that examined and responded to political issues in the Middle East, as well as to antisemitism.

In 1990, she served as a founding director for Jews for Racial and Economic Justice (JFREJ), a progressive Jewish organization focused mostly on anti-racist work and issues of economic justice. Kaye/Kantrowitz served on the JFREJ board from 1995 to 2004. Of her work with JFREJ, Kaye/Kantrowitz said: "Though the content of our mission is not specifically feminist, we have modeled feminist activism and included a feminist spin on issues such as hate violence, right of workers to organize, police brutality, and educational equity."

Around 1990, she also co-founded Beyond the Pale: The Progressive Jewish Radio Hour, a radio program that aired weekly on WBAI (99.5 FM) which "mixes local, national, and international political debate and analysis, from a progressive Jewish perspective with the voices and sounds of contemporary Jewish culture".

Kaye/Kantrowitz also served on the steering committee of New Jewish Agenda.

Academia
Melanie Kaye/Kantrowitz taught the first women's studies course at the University of California, Berkeley. She also taught at Hamilton College, Brooklyn College/CUNY, Vermont College., and  Jewish studies, history and comparative literature at Queens College.

Death
Kaye/Kantrowitz died on July 10, 2018, of Parkinson's disease, aged 73.

Publications

Kaye/Kantrowitz's works include:
We Speak in Code: Poems and Other Writings (1980, Motheroot Publications)
The Tribe of Dina: A Jewish Women’s Anthology (1989, Beacon Press; editor, with Irena Klepfisz)
My Jewish Face, and Other Stories (1990, Aunt Lute Books)
The Issue is Power: Essays on Women, Jews, Violence and Resistance (1995, Aunt Lute Books)
The Colors of Jews: Racial Politics and Radical Diasporism (2007, Indiana University Press)

She contributed to anthologies, including:
Lesbian Poetry: An Anthology (1981)
Fight Back: Feminist Resistance to Male Violence (1981)
Nice Jewish Girls: A Lesbian Anthology (1984)

Kaye/Kantrowitz also edited the lesbian periodical Sinister Wisdom from 1983 to 1987.

References

1945 births
2018 deaths
Activists for African-American civil rights
American feminist writers
American people of Polish-Jewish descent
American people of Russian-Jewish descent
Feminist studies scholars
Jewish American writers
Jewish anti-racism activists
Jewish feminists
Lesbian feminists
American lesbian writers
LGBT Jews
American women essayists
20th-century American essayists
21st-century American essayists
Neurological disease deaths in the United States
Deaths from Parkinson's disease
American women poets
20th-century American poets
21st-century American poets
American social justice activists
American political activists
Jewish activists
LGBT people from New York (state)
Writers from Brooklyn
Activists from New York City
American women academics
Lesbian academics
Brooklyn College faculty
20th-century American women writers
21st-century American women writers
Women civil rights activists
21st-century American Jews